Oratino is a comune (municipality) in the Province of Campobasso in the Italian region Molise, located about  west of Campobasso.

Oratino borders the following municipalities: Busso, Campobasso, Castropignano, Ripalimosani.

Demographic evolution

References

External links
 www.comune.oratino.cb.it

Cities and towns in Molise